H. D. Kumaraswamy ministry was the Council of Ministers in Karnataka, a state in South India headed by H. D. Kumaraswamy that was formed after the Dharam Singh ministry fell short of majority.

In the government headed by H. D. Kumaraswamy, the Chief Minister was from JD(S) while Deputy Chief Minister was from BJP. Apart from the CM & Deputy CM, there were other ministers in the government.

Tenure of the Government 
After the 2004 assembly elections, BJP emerged as the single largest party with 79 seats, followed by the INC with 65 seats and JD(S) with 58 seats. JD(S) extended the support to INC to form the government. Governor T. N. Chaturvedi invited the alliance to form the government. Known for his adaptability and friendly nature, Dharam Singh of the Congress was the unanimous choice of both parties to head the government. He was sworn in as Chief Minister on 28 May 2004 with the support of JD(S). JD(S) MLA Siddaramaiah was sworn in as the Deputy Chief Minister, along with Chief Minister Dharam Singh. On 18 January 2006, Forty-two MLAs of Janata Dal (Secular) under Kumaraswamy's leadership left the coalition and the government collapsed. Chief Minister Dharam Singh was asked to prove majority on 25 January 2006. He resigned since he did not have enough numbers. On 28 January 2006, Karnataka Governor T. N. Chaturvedi invited Kumaraswamy to form the government in the state after the resignation of the Congress Government led by Dharam Singh.

H. D. Kumaraswamy was sworn in as the Chief Minister of Karnataka on 3 February 2006, along with B. S. Yediyurappa of the BJP who took oath as Deputy Chief Minister of Karnataka. The first expansion of the cabinet took place on 18 February 2006 where 20 Ministers were inducted — 11 from the BJP and 9 from the JD(S). The cabinet was further expanded on 21 June 2006 with the induction of 8 ministers, 4 each from both the parties. The cabinet was reshuffled on 25 January 2007 wherein three ministers from JD(S) and two from the BJP were sworn in.

On 27 September 2007, Kumaraswamy said that he would leave office on 3 October as part of a power-sharing agreement between the Janata Dal (Secular) and the Bharatiya Janata Party (BJP), despite the calls of some legislators in the JD(S) for him to remain in office for the time being, due to complications in arranging the transfer of power. However, on 4 October 2007, he refused to transfer power to the BJP. Finally, on 8 October 2007, he tendered his resignation to Governor Rameshwar Thakur, and the state was put under President's rule two days later.

Council of Ministers 

|}
If the office of a Minister is vacant for any length of time, it automatically comes under the charge of the Chief Minister.

See also 

 Karnataka Legislative Assembly

References

External links 

 Council of Ministers 

Cabinets established in 2006
2006 establishments in Karnataka
Kumaraswamy 01
Janata Dal (Secular) ministries
2007 disestablishments in India
Cabinets disestablished in 2007
2006 in Indian politics
H. D. Kumaraswamy